The canton of Léguevin is an administrative division of the Haute-Garonne department, southern France. Its borders were modified at the French canton reorganisation which came into effect in March 2015. Its seat is in Léguevin.

It consists of the following communes:
 
Bellegarde-Sainte-Marie
Bellesserre
Bretx
Brignemont
Le Burgaud
Cabanac-Séguenville
Cadours
Le Castéra
Caubiac
Cox
Daux
Drudas
Garac
Grenade
Le Grès
Lagraulet-Saint-Nicolas
Laréole
Larra
Lasserre-Pradère
Launac
Léguevin
Lévignac
Menville
Mérenvielle
Merville
Montaigut-sur-Save
Ondes
Pelleport
Puysségur
Saint-Cézert
Sainte-Livrade
Saint-Paul-sur-Save
La Salvetat-Saint-Gilles
Thil
Vignaux

References

Cantons of Haute-Garonne